Wentworth is a small Canadian rural community located in the Wentworth Valley of Cumberland County, Nova Scotia. It is named after Sir John Wentworth, a former lieutenant-governor of the province.

The community takes in the following hamlets:
 Lower Wentworth
 Wentworth Centre
 Wentworth Station
 Wentworth Valley
 East Wentworth
 West Wentworth
 Appleton

The area is also the home of an alpine ski hill, Ski Wentworth, along with a provincial park and the Wentworth Hostel.

In April 2020, Wentworth was one of the locations associated with the 2020 Nova Scotia attacks, the deadliest rampage in Canada's history. At least four were killed there.

References

External links
  Photographs of the Wentworth Valley War Memorial monument, Wentworth, Nova Scotia

Communities in Cumberland County, Nova Scotia